Workers' and Peasants' Party (Rodosha nominto, shortened Ronoto) was a left-wing political party in Japan, founded in December 1948 by a group of left socialists led by Hisao Kuroda excluded from the Socialist Party of Japan in July 1948. At the time the party had 10 councillors in the parliament.

In the 1952 elections, Ronoto obtained 4 seats, in 1953 elections - 5. On 17 January, 1957, it has re-joined SPJ.

Defunct political parties in Japan
Socialist parties in Japan
Political parties established in 1948
Political parties disestablished in 1957